Kimball Lake is a lake in Meadow Lake Provincial Park in the Canadian Province of Saskatchewan in the boreal forest ecozone of Canada. The lake is located near the centre of the park, north of the Waterhen River and Little Raspberry Lake and south of First Mustus Lake. Rusty and Greig Lakes are to the east. Several small streams feed into the lake and the outflow is at the southern shore, which feeds into the Waterhen River, a tributary of Beaver River. The Beaver River, in turn, flows north into Lac Île-à-la-Crosse and the Churchill River, a major tributary in the Hudson Bay drainage basin.

The lake is accessed from Highway 224, which runs along its northern shore. Also on the northern shore is a small subdivision of cabins, and along the eastern part of the lake is Kimball Lake Beach and Campground.

Recreation
Kimball Lake Campground has 190 individual campsites as well as group sites with access to a one kilometre long sandy beach. There are full-service and electric-only campsites, public washrooms, showers, and laundry available, as well as a store, playground, picnic area, and sani-dump.

A nearly 10-kilometre long interpretive trail heads south from the campground and goes around Little Raspberry Lake.

Fish species
Walleye, northern pike, and tiger trout are species of fish commonly found in the lake.

See also
List of lakes of Saskatchewan
Tourism in Saskatchewan

References

Lakes of Saskatchewan
Meadow Lake No. 588, Saskatchewan
Division No. 17, Saskatchewan